The 2022 Newark mayoral election was held on May 10, 2022, to elect the Mayor of Newark, New Jersey. Elections for all seats on the nine member Municipal Council of Newark were held on the same day. Elections were non-partisan and candidates were not listed by political party. Incumbent Mayor Ras Baraka ran for re-election and easily won a third term.

Candidates 
 Ras Baraka, incumbent Mayor of Newark
 Sheila Montague, Newark Public Schools teacher and founding member of Parents United for Local School Education

Results

References

External links 
Official campaign websites
 Sheila Montague for Mayor

May 2022 events in the United States
2022
Newark
Newark